Anthony Epifanio Solometo (born December 2, 2002) is an American professional baseball pitcher in the Pittsburgh Pirates organization.

Amateur career
Solometo began his high school career at Gloucester Catholic High School in Gloucester City, New Jersey. He committed to play college baseball at the University of North Carolina prior to his freshman year. As a sophomore in 2019, he went 5–2 with a 1.59 ERA and 64 strikeouts over 44 innings. Prior to his junior season in 2020, he transferred to Bishop Eustace Preparatory School in Pennsauken Township, New Jersey, where he graduated in 2021. As a senior in 2021, he did not give up his first run or first hit until  innings into the season. He finished the season with a 0.22 ERA and 65 strikeouts over  innings.

Professional career
Solometo was selected by the Pittsburgh Pirates in the second round with the 37th overall selection of the 2021 Major League Baseball draft. Solometo signed with the Pirates for a $2.8 million signing bonus.

After starting the 2022 season in extended spring training, Solometo was assigned to the Bradenton Marauders of the Single-A Florida State League in late May to make his professional debut. Over 13 games (eight starts), he went 5-1 with a 2.64 ERA and 51 strikeouts over  innings.

References

External links

2002 births
Living people
Baseball players from New Jersey
Gloucester Catholic High School alumni
People from Voorhees Township, New Jersey
Sportspeople from Camden County, New Jersey
Bishop Eustace Preparatory School alumni
Bradenton Marauders players